Zoomkoom is a fermented beverage from Burkina Faso and Northern Ghana with a sweet taste.

"Zoom" means flour and “koom” means water in the Mooré language. There are varieties of "zoomkoom",the traditional and modernized one.The traditional beverage is brown in color and the modernized has a white appearance because millet is used in place of guinea corn and without shea butter.

Ingredients 
 ginger
 grains of selim
 cloves
 pepper 
 shea butter (optional)
 milled millet/ guinea corn

Method of preparation 
Peeled tamarinds are soaked in water, and then boiled and sugar is added. Millet flour, chilli pepper and ginger are then added, and the mixture is stirred to a smooth consistency. The drink is served cold.

Uses 

 “zoomkoom” is a welcome-to-my-house drink and is usually offered to guests.
 traditional ceremonies

References 

Ghana drinks